Lacuna is a genus of sea snails, marine gastropod mollusks in the family Littorinidae, the winkles or periwinkles.

Description
The spiral animal body is elongated. The mouth has a proboscis with two thick lips and a spiral, filiform tongue. There are two slender, contractile tentacles with the eyes on small pedicels near their base. The foot is oval and somewhat broader behind.

The thin shell has an ovate-conical or subglobose shape and is covered with a delicate horny periostracum. It has a short spire with convex whorls that are rapidly expanding. The last whorl is ventricose, i.e. inflated in the middle. The apex is rather obtuse. The oval or roundish aperture is covered with a horny, spirally marked operculum. The peristome is incomplete behind. The columella is flattened and forms with the peristome an elongated groove continued from the umbilicus. This groove is bounded internally by the decurved margin of the pillar.

Species
The following species are recognised in the genus Lacuna:
 

Lacuna amaina 
Lacuna carinifera 
Lacuna cleicecabrale 
Lacuna crassior 
Lacuna decorata 
Lacuna dialyta 
Lacuna dutemplii 
Lacuna globulosa 
Lacuna grandis 
Lacuna houdasi 
Lacuna latifasciata 
Lacuna lepidula 
Lacuna lukinii 
Lacuna macrostoma 
Lacuna marmorata 
Lacuna minor 
Lacuna orientalis 
Lacuna pallidula 
Lacuna parva 
Lacuna porrecta 
Lacuna pulchella 
Lacuna pumilio 
Lacuna reflexa 
Lacuna sigaretina 
Lacuna smithii 
Lacuna succinea 
Lacuna sulcifera 
Lacuna turgida 
Lacuna turneri 
Lacuna turrita 
Lacuna uchidai 
Lacuna unifasciata 
Lacuna vaginata 
Lacuna variegata 
Lacuna vincta 

Species brought into synonymy
 Lacuna abyssicola Melvill & Standen, 1912: synonym of Moelleriopsis poppei Engl, 2012
 Lacuna azonata Locard, 1886: synonym of Megalomphalus azoneus (Brusina, 1865)
 Lacuna carinata Gould, 1848: synonym of Lacuna vincta (Montagu, 1803)
 Lacuna cossmanni Locard, 1897 : synonym of Benthobia tryonii Dall, 1889
 Lacuna macmurdensis Hedley, 1911 : synonym of Trilirata macmurdensis (Hedley, 1911)
 Lacuna mediterranea Monterosato, 1869 : synonym of Ersilia mediterranea (Monterosato, 1869)
 Lacuna neritoidea Gould, 1840 : synonym of Lacuna pallidula (da Costa, 1778)
 Lacuna notorcadensis Melvill & Standen, 1907: synonym of Laevilitorina wandelensis (Lamy, 1905)
 Lacuna pallidula var. patula Hanley in Thorpe, 1844: synonym of Lacuna pallidula (da Costa, 1778)
 Lacuna puteolus (Turton, 1819) : synonym of Lacuna parva (da Costa, 1778)

References

 Reid D. G. (1989). "The comparative morphology, phylogeny and evolution of the gastropod family Littorinidae". Philosophical Transactions of the Royal Society of London, Series B 324: 1-110

External links
 Miocene Gastropods and Biostratigraphy of the Kern River Area, California; United States Geological Survey Professional Paper 642 

Littorinidae